People's Square station may refer to:
 People's Square station (Shanghai Metro)
 People's Square station (Hangzhou Metro)